The final of the 2013 ICC Champions Trophy was played on 23 June 2013 between the England and India at the Edgbaston Cricket Ground, Birmingham.This was the 7th ICC Champions Trophy. India won the match by 5 runs England qualified into the final by defeating South Africa in the first semi-final at The Oval, London on 19 June 2013. India  made their way into the final after defeating Sri Lanka in the second semi-final played at SWALEC Stadium, Cardiff on 20 June 2013. The match was delayed almost six hours for rain and started at 16:20 local time, and the match was reduced to 20 overs per innings. So all the rules of this match were the same as a Twenty20 game. It was India's 2nd ICC Champions Trophy championship after the 2002 ICC Champions Trophy. But they had to share the honour with Sri Lanka since this was a joint championship winning. So this was the first time when India won that title individually. In addition India became the second team after Australia to win the ICC Champions Trophy more than one time.  Ravindra Jadeja earned the man of the match award for his performance in the match. Shikhar Dhawan was named the man of the series for scoring 363 runs in the tournament. In the stadium, the match was watched by  24,867 spectators.

Background 
Prior to this match England and India played 86 times against each other in ODIs, where India had the upper hand with 46 wins and England won in 35 matches. 2 matches were tied and 3 match were ended as No Result. Their latest meeting resulted a six wickets win for England in a bilateral series in India at 2013.

These teams met thrice in the ICC Champions Trophy history where India won all the three games.

Road to the final

India 
India had dominated the tournament from the first match to semi final match. They beat South Africa, West Indies and Pakistan in assertive wins to be the group champions of Group B. They brought their strong performance to the semi final match too where they beat Sri Lanka by 8 wickets to reach the final for the third time after 2000 and 2002. 2 century & 1 half century from Shikhar Dhawan powered the Indian batting line up. Ravindra Jadeja was the leader from the front of the Indian bowling line up.
India didn't lose a single match since the start of the tournament with winning both of their practice matches too.

England 
England's qualified for the semi finals as the group champions of Group A In the very first match of their tournament they won against Australia by 48 runs but lost to Sri Lanka in the next match. But they beat New Zealand in the last match to qualify for the semi final. In the semi final they beat South Africa with Jonathan Trott scoring an unbeaten 82 run innings, England won the match by 7 wickets. It was the second time after 2004 that England made the final but lost the final of ICC Champions Trophy.

Match Details

Match Officials 
The on-field umpires were Kumar Dharmasena of Sri Lanka and Rod Tucker of Australia, with Bruce Oxenford being the third (TV) umpire. Aleem Dar was the fourth umpire. Ranjan Madugalle was the match referee.

Toss 
England's captain Alastair Cook won the toss in the rain delayed game and chose to field first.

Match Summary

References

External links 

ICC Champions Trophy 2013

ICC Champions Trophy Finals
2013 ICC Champions Trophy